The Polar Express is a 1985 fantasy children's picture book written and illustrated by American author Chris Van Allsburg. The book is now widely considered to be a classic Christmas story for young children. It was praised for its detailed illustrations and calm, relaxing storyline. For the work, Van Allsburg won the annual Caldecott Medal for illustration of an American children's picture book in 1986, his second after Jumanji.

The book is set partially in Grand Rapids, Michigan, the author's home town, and was inspired in part by Van Allsburg's memories of visiting the Herpolsheimer's and Wurzburg's department stores as a child. It was adapted as an Oscar-nominated motion-capture film in 2004 starring Tom Hanks and directed by Robert Zemeckis. Van Allsburg served as an executive producer on the film.

Plot summary
A young boy is awakened on Christmas Eve night by the sound of a train. To his astonishment, he finds the train is waiting for him right outside his house. He sees a conductor who then proceeds to look up at his window. He runs downstairs and goes outside. The conductor explains the train is called the Polar Express, and is journeying to the North Pole. The boy then boards the train, which is filled with many other children in their pajamas being served hot chocolate by the train's staff.

The Polar Express races north past towns and villages, through boreal forests, and over mountains, but the train never slows down. When it arrives at the North Pole, the conductor explains that Santa will select one of them to receive the first gift of Christmas.

The boy and the other children see thousands of elves gathered at the center of town waiting to send Santa Claus on his way. The boy is handpicked by Santa to receive the first gift of Christmas. Realizing that he could choose anything in the world, the boy asks for a bell from one of the reindeer's harnesses. The boy places the bell in the pocket of his robe and all the children watch as Santa takes off into the night for his annual deliveries.

Later, on the train ride home, the boy discovers that the bell has fallen through a hole in his pocket. The boy arrives home and goes to his bedroom, the conductor wishing him a Merry Christmas as the train speeds away. On Christmas morning, his sister Sarah finds a small package for the boy under the tree, behind all of the other gifts. The boy opens the box and discovers that it contains the bell, delivered by Santa along with a note explaining that he found it on the seat of his sleigh. When the boy rings the bell, both he and his sister marvel at the beautiful sound. His parents, however, are unable to hear the bell and remark that it must be broken. The book ends with the following line:

Development
Van Allsburg based the story on a mental image of a child wandering into the woods on a foggy night and wondering where a train was headed.

At the premiere of the film, Van Allsburg stated that Pere Marquette 1225, a class N1 2-8-4 Berkshire steam locomotive formerly owned by Michigan State University and now owned by the Steam Railroading Institute in Owosso, Michigan, was the inspiration for the story line. He played on the engine as a child when it was on display and was inspired by the number 1225, which to him was 12/25 – Christmas Day. The real 1225 was used to create the animated image of the engine.

The engine is fourteen and a half feet tall and 101 feet long and weighs 400 tons. It is one of the biggest steam locomotives in operation in the United States.

All the locomotive sounds were recorded from the 1225 in 2002. The only exception to this is the whistle, which was recorded from Sierra Railway No. 3.

Reception
In 1986, The Polar Express was awarded the Caldecott Medal and appeared on the New York Times bestseller list. By 1989, a million copies had been sold – more each year than the last – and the book had made the bestseller list four years in a row.
 
Based on a 2007 online poll, the National Education Association listed the book as one of its "Teachers' Top 100 Books for Children". It was one of the "Top 100 Picture Books" of all time in a 2012 poll by School Library Journal.

Film adaptation

The Polar Express is a 2004 American computer-animated film based on the book. Written, produced, and directed by Robert Zemeckis, the film features human characters animated using the live action performance capture technique.

The film stars Daryl Sabara, Nona Gaye, Jimmy Bennett, Michael Jeter, Eddie Deezen and Tom Hanks. The film was first released in both conventional and IMAX 3D theaters November 10, 2004, and grossed $307 million worldwide.

Rail tours 
The Polar Express has inspired real-life train rides across the United States, Canada, and the United Kingdom based on the book and film. These train rides are hosted by a number of different railways, including the Grand Canyon Railway, the Great Smoky Mountains Railroad, the Texas State Railroad, the Steam Railroading Institute in Owosso, Michigan, the Valley Railroad in Connecticut, the Western Maryland Scenic Railroad in Frostburg, Maryland, and others. Beginning in 2016, the UK's Telford Steam Railway offered the Polar Express ride on a steam engine.

The round-trip journey to the "North Pole" includes a live musical performance, hot cocoa and cookies, and Christmas characters such as Santa Claus and Mrs. Claus. At some locations, guests are invited to wear pajamas, similar to the characters in the book.

Notes

References

External Links 
 The Polar Express
 

1985 children's books
Fictional trains
Caldecott Medal–winning works
American picture books
Novels by Chris Van Allsburg
Picture books by Chris Van Allsburg
Christmas children's books
Children's books about rail transport
Fictional locomotives
Arctic in fiction
Michigan in fiction
Houghton Mifflin books
Children's books adapted into films
Trains in fiction